Vision (English: Vision – From the Life of Hildegard von Bingen) is a 2009 German film directed by Margarethe von Trotta.

Plot
In Vision, New German Cinema auteur Margarethe von Trotta (Marianne and Julianne, Rosa Luxemburg and Rosentrasse) tells the story of Hildegard of Bingen, the famed 12th century Benedictine nun, Christian mystic, composer, philosopher, playwright, physician, poet, naturalist, scientist and ecological activist.  Hildegard was a multi-talented, highly intelligent woman who had to work within the narrow social roles allowed for women at the time.

Cast
 Barbara Sukowa as Hildegard of Bingen
 Stella Holzapfel as Hildegard as a Child
 Heino Ferch as Brother Volmar
 Hannah Herzsprung as Sister Richardis
 Mareile Blendi as Countess Jutta von Sponheim
 Sunnyi Melles as Marchioness Richardis von Stade
 Alexander Held as Abbot Kuno
 Lena Stolze as Sister Jutta
 Paula Kalenberg as Sister Clara
 Annemarie Düringer as Abbess Tengwich
 Devid Striesow as Emperor Frederick Barbarossa

Production
Integrally involved with the 1970s Women’s Movement, filmmaker Margarethe von Trotta has always been drawn to women whose story has been marginalized over time.  Von Trotta and others re-found Hildegard von Bingen in their search for historically forgotten (or misremembered) women. While writing the screenplay for her 1983 film Rosa Luxemburg, von Trotta’s interest in Hildegard re-emerged and she wondered whether Hildegard’s life would be good material for a movie.  After writing a few scenes, von Trotta felt the film had a powerful message and potential resonance but didn’t feel she could find a producer ready to make the movie.  Thus, von Trotta shelved the idea until it came to cinematic fruition recently.

The film reunites von Trotta with Barbara Sukowa (Zentropa, Berlin Alexanderplatz).  Sukowa portrays Hildegard’s fierce determination to expand the responsibilities of women within the Benedictine order, as she fends off outrage from the Church over the visions she claims to receive from God.  Shot in the original medieval cloisters in the German countryside, in Vision, von Trotta and Sukowa create a portrait of a woman who has emerged from the shadows of history as a forward-thinking pioneer of faith, change and enlightenment.  The film depicts Hildegard's diplomatic (sometime manipulative) skills to understand men and their vanities in order to found her own convent. It captures Hildegard’s love of happiness, mankind and their connectedness to faith.

Vision made its European debut in 2009 and is being distributed in the U.S. by Zeitgeist Films starting October 13, 2010.

Accolades
Official Selection - Telluride Film Festival 2009
Official Selection - Toronto International Film Festival 2009

References

External links
 
 
 

Films directed by Margarethe von Trotta
2009 films
2000s biographical films
2000s historical films
German biographical films
German historical films
2000s German-language films
Films set in the 12th century
Films set in the Holy Roman Empire
Films about classical music and musicians
Hildegard of Bingen
2000s German films